Giancarlo Vilarinho (born April 2, 1992) is a Brazilian racecar driver from São Paulo.

After karting, Vilarinho raced in Formula BMW Americas and Formula BMW Europe for the Eurointernational team in 2008, finishing sixth in the Americas series and also competed in the World Finals. In 2009 he returned to Eurointernational and Formula BMW Americas and finished second to his teammate Gabby Chaves, capturing 7 wins in the process. He also participated in one Star Mazda race for AIM Autosport. With Formula BMW Americas canceled for 2010, Vilarinho sat out much of the season until signing on with Andersen Racing to make his Firestone Indy Lights debut at the Mid-Ohio Sports Car Course. Vilarinho finished 13th at Mid-Ohio and tenth in the race at Infineon Raceway later that month. Those were his final professional auto racing appearances.

References

External links
Giancarlo Vilarinho official website 

1992 births
Brazilian racing drivers
Indy Lights drivers
Formula BMW USA drivers
Formula BMW Europe drivers
Indy Pro 2000 Championship drivers
Living people
Racing drivers from São Paulo

EuroInternational drivers